Chakyar (also spelled Cakyar, Chakkiar, Chakiar, etc.) is an intermediate priestly caste coming under the Ambalavasi community of Hindus in the Kerala state of India. The women in this caste are called Illotammas.

They occupy a position in the Hindu Temple in managing the affairs of the temple, though not the actual conduct of ceremonies. They are assigned with the holy temple ritualistic performance called Chakyar Koothu and Koodiyattam, which is the only surviving ancient Sanskrit theatre in India.

Chakyar is the main actor who performs the ritualistic Koothus and Koodiyattams inside the temple or in Koothambalams. Their women, Illotammas, are not allowed to participate in these. The women roles are done by ladies of Nambiar community called Nangyarammas. Nambiar plays the holy drum Mizhavu.

There were 18 Chakyar families throughout Kerala, but now their number is small. Mani family is one of them. The greatest Koodiyattam and Chakyar koothu exponent, Natyashastra scholar and world-renowned Guru, (late) Natyacharya Vidushakaratnam Padma Shri Mani Madhava Chakyar belonged to this family.

Chakyars preferred to associate themselves more with the Ambalavasis than what they considered the unequal status amongst the Namboothris.

See also
 Ammannur Madhava Chakyar
 Ammannur Rajaneesh Chakyar
 Mani Damodara Chakyar
 Mani Madhava Chakyar
 Painkulam Raman Chakyar
 List of Ambalavasis

References
 Natyakalpadrumam, by Guru Mani Madhava Chakyar,1975.

External links

Shree Painkulam Raman Chakyar

Social groups of India
Indian surnames
Kerala society
Indian castes
Malayali people
Social groups of Kerala
Hindu communities